The 1913 New York state election was held on November 4, 1913, to elect the Chief Judge and an associate judge of the New York Court of Appeals, as well as all members of the New York State Assembly.

Background
In 1913, there were only two state officer to be elected statewide: the Chief Judge, to succeed Edgar M. Cullen, and an associate judge of the Court of Appeals, to succeed John Clinton Gray who both had reached the constitutional age limit of 70 years.

Nominations
The Republican state convention met on September 23 at Carnegie Hall in New York City. U.S. Senator Elihu Root was Permanent chairman. They nominated Associate Judge (elected in 1904) William E. Werner for Chief Judge (vote: Werner 447, Edgar Truman Brackett 151); and Associate Judge (designated in 1906) Frank H. Hiscock for associate judge (vote: Hiscock 444, Frederick E. Crane 157).

The Progressive state convention met on September 27 at Rochester, New York. They nominated federal judge Learned Hand for Chief Judge, and Justice Samuel Seabury for associate judge.

The Democratic State Committee met on October 4 at the Knickerbocker Hotel in New York City. George M. Palmer was chairman. They nominated two Democrats, Associate Judge (elected in 1907) Willard Bartlett, and Abram I. Elkus, although Alton B. Parker, Chairman of the Committee on Non-partisan Candidates of the State and county bar associations, had recommended to endorse the Republican nominees (vote: Bartlett 38, Werner 3; Elkus 37, Hiscock 4).

The Independence League State Committee met at Arlington Hall, in St. Mark's Place in New York City, after the Democratic and Republican nominations had been made, and endorsed Democrat Bartlett and Republican Hiscock.

Result
The cross-endorsed Independence League ticket, made up of the Democratic Chief Judge and the Republican associate judge, was elected.

Both Bartlett and Hiscock continued on the Court, Bartlett becoming Chief Judge, and Hiscock moving from an additional to a regular seat.

Note: "Blank, void and scattering" votes: 49,138 (for Chief Judge)

Notes

Sources
Result in State of New York Delegates and Alternates to the Republican National Convention, Chicago, June 7, 1916 (printed for the Republican Party [N.Y.], Tenny Press, 1916)
Vote totals from New York Red Book 1914

See also
New York state elections

1913
1913 New York (state) elections